11-cis-retinol dehydrogenase (RDH5 (gene)) is an enzyme with systematic name 11-cis-retinol:NAD+ oxidoreductase. This enzyme catalyses the following chemical reaction

 11-cis-retinol---[retinal-binding-protein] + NAD+  11-cis-retinal---[retinol-binding-protein] + NADH + H+

This enzyme from retinal pigment epithelium, catalyses the reduction of 11-cis-retinol to 11-cis-retinal.

References

External links 
 

EC 1.1.1